Huang Chao-shun (born 22 August 1953) is a member of the Kuomintang (KMT) who is in the Legislative Yuan in Taiwan.

Early life and education
Huang's father , served as president of the Control Yuan from 1987 to 1993. Huang earned her bachelor's degree in pharmacy from Kaohsiung Medical College and master's degree in business administration from National Sun Yat-sen University (NSYSU).

2008 Republic of China Legislative election
On 12 January 2008, Huang joined the Republic of China legislative election as the KMT candidate representing Kaohsiung City's 1st constituency. She eventually went on to win the election with the highest votes in Kaohsiung among other 8 elects.

2010 Kaohsiung Mayoralty election
On 27 November 2010, Huang joined Kaohsiung City Mayoralty election as the KMT candidate. However, she lost to incumbent Kaohsiung City Mayor Chen Chu of the Democratic Progressive Party.

2012 Republic of China Legislative election
On 14 January 2012, Huang joined the Republic of China legislative election as the KMT candidate representing Kaohsiung City's 3rd constituency. She eventually won the election.

Personal life
Huang is married with one child.

References

Living people
1953 births
National Sun Yat-sen University alumni
Kaohsiung Medical University alumni
Members of the 2nd Legislative Yuan
Members of the 3rd Legislative Yuan
Members of the 4th Legislative Yuan
Members of the 5th Legislative Yuan
Members of the 6th Legislative Yuan
Members of the 7th Legislative Yuan
Members of the 8th Legislative Yuan
Members of the 9th Legislative Yuan
Party List Members of the Legislative Yuan
Kuomintang Members of the Legislative Yuan in Taiwan
Kaohsiung Members of the Legislative Yuan
21st-century Taiwanese women politicians
20th-century Taiwanese women politicians